Les affaires publiques (also known as Public Affairs) is a 1934 French directorial debut short film by Robert Bresson. It is considered a lost film.

Plot
A comedic short film about two fictional rival republics.

References

External links 

1934 films
French comedy short films
Films directed by Robert Bresson
1934 directorial debut films
1930s French-language films
1930s French films